Stelvio National Park is a national park in northeast Italy, established in 1935.

The park is the largest in Italy and covers part of two regions: Trentino-Alto Adige/Südtirol and Lombardia, in 24 municipalities.

Stelvio National Park has borders with the Swiss National Park, Adamello Brenta Natural Park, and Adamello Regional Park. Together, these parks comprise  of protected natural environment.

References

External links
Pages by the Park Authority on Parks.it
official page of park Parco nazionale dello Stelvio

Information:

National parks of Italy
Parks in Trentino-Alto Adige/Südtirol
Parks in Lombardy
Protected areas of the Alps